The 2016–17 Akron Zips women's basketball team represented the University of Akron during the 2016–17 NCAA Division I women's basketball season. The Zips, led by 11th year head coach Jodi Kest, played their home games at the James A. Rhodes Arena as members of the East Division of the Mid-American Conference. They finished the season 9–21 overall, 2–16 in MAC play to finish in 11th place. As the No. 11 seed in the 2017 MAC tournament, they were defeated by Toledo 37–65 in the opening round.

Schedule

|-
!colspan=9 style="background:#C29C41; color:#000E41;"| Non-conference regular season

|-
!colspan=9 style="background:#C29C41; color:#000E41;"| MAC regular season

|-
!colspan=9 style="background:#C29C41; color:#000E41;"| MAC Tournament

See also
2016–17 Akron Zips men's basketball team

References

Akron Zips women's basketball seasons
Akron